Marwan El Shorbagy (born July 30, 1993, in Alexandria) is a professional squash player who represents Egypt. He reached a career-high world ranking of World No. 3 in May 2018. He won the World Juniors in 2011 & 2012 and became the third player in history to win the World Junior twice.

Career overview 

Marwan was born and raised in the Egyptian city of Alexandria. He started playing squash at age of eight.
Marwan El Shorbagy joined the PSA in 2010 as a 17-year-old. Raised in Alexandria, but then a student at Millfield School in England (where he was coached by Jonah Barrington and Ian Thomas), El Shorbagy is the latest Egyptian to shake up the world of squash. He is the younger brother of Mohamed El Shorbagy who also plays on the PSA tour and is current World No. 1.

Despite now combining his squash career with that of a student at University in the UK, 19-year-old El Shorbagy celebrated his world top thirty debut in July.
In July 2012 he won his second successive World Junior Open title – to become only the third man in history to win the world junior title for a second time, also he is the first player in the history to win 2 individuals and 2 teams World titles.

"I had never thought growing up that I would win a U19 British Open Junior title, or a World Junior title. And here I am. With two of each. And I feel so honoured that I can add my name to the two prestigious ones that have 2 world junior titles, Ramy and my brother. It’s such an honour."

But it was in July 2011 that the youngster made his first major impact on the senior stage. After winning his first ever World Junior title in Herentals the 17-year-old After qualifying he beat World Number 28 Aamir Atlas Khan in the quarter finals of an international 25 event in Cairo, he then went to beat World Number 14 Omar Mosaad in the semis after a marathon match and then finally being stopped by another Egyptian Mohd Ali Anwar Reda losing 17–15 in the 5th.

It was in November 2011 that the 17-year-old made his first ever appearance in the World Open, after qualifying the 17-year-old beat Pakistani Farhan Mehboob before upsetting 11th seed and former English national champion Daryl Selby 11-8 11-7 5-11 4-11 13–11 in 85 minutes and then finally being stopped in the last 16 round by the number three seed and current World number one James Willstrop.

"That was the best win of my career, for sure. I was playing each point like it was the final - I tried not to concentrate on the score at all. I had to play more than my best to win - and I did. "

He reached his first PSA Tour final at the Crocodile Cup in Hong Kong in October 2010 only his second appearance in a PSA tournament – then in April 2011 netted his first Tour title at the Aramex Open in Jordan.

After winning his 2nd British Open Junior title, El Shorbagy began his 2012 campaign in January in the US, after qualifying in his first ever appearance in the Tournament of Champions. The 18-year-old beat experienced Frenchman Thierry Lincou World Number ten in four games before upsetting World Number 18 Tom Richards 9-11 11-5 6-11 11-6 12–10 in 85 minutes to reach the quarter finals of a Super Series tournament for the first time and to become the first qualifier to reach the quarter finals of the ToC in 10 years.

"I am so happy with my performance in this tournament, I never expected to beat the top players at such a young age but now I have the confidence that I can, and I am hungry to go on court with the top player."

References

External links 
 
 

1993 births
Living people
Egyptian male squash players
Sportspeople from Alexandria
21st-century Egyptian people